Katherine Langbroek (born 8 August 1965) is an Australian comedian, radio and television presenter.

Langbroek has previously hosted Hughesy & Kate with Dave Hughes on the HIT Network.

Career
Langbroek has a degree in journalism and has appeared on The Panel, Thank God You're Here, The Project, All Star Family Feud, Have You Been Paying Attention?, and Hughesy, We Have a Problem.

From the start of 2018, Langbroek co-hosts Hughesy & Kate on the Australian HIT Network, with Dave Hughes and anchor Jack Laurence. It is an afternoon drive time program. The program was on the KIIS Network until the end of 2017.  A previous segment of the program was 'Katie Cracks It' in which she talked about whatever has made her angry over the past few days. 
She was a radio announcer on the 3RRR programme Breakfasters. Langbroek previously worked as an actress (appearing in soap opera Chances and in a Transport Accident Commission Community Service Announcement); and as a script writer for Neighbours. Langbroek was a competitor in Dancing with the Stars in 2006. She was the sixth celebrity eliminated in Episode 8. She also competed in, and won, the weekly Thank God You're Here challenge on Network Ten on Wednesday, 18 July 2007.

Kate was also a guest on, and won, the quiz show Out of the Question, for the episode airing on Thursday 28 February 2008. Her name was engraved on the 'Out of the Question' trophy, alongside the likes of Ed Kavalee and Tony Moclair. Langbroek has also been a guest co-host on Network Ten's morning show The Circle. In November 2020, it was announced that Langbroek would replace Rebecca Judd as the co-host of the 3pm Pick-up in 2021.

Personal life
Her mother, Anne, is part Jamaican and American, and her father, Jan Langbroek, is Dutch, and they both worked as missionaries in Papua New Guinea. She was raised as a Jehovah's Witness and was bullied for her religion and appearance during her attendance at Salisbury High School (Queensland). She married engineer Peter Allen Lewis in 2003, and is the mother of four children. She breast-fed live on The Panel shortly after the birth of her first son. Her brother is John-Paul Langbroek, a Queensland state politician and former leader of the Liberal National Party.

On 8 August 2013, Langbroek revealed that in March 2013, her eldest child had received the "all clear" after a three and a half year battle with leukaemia. The family had chosen not to share on the radio his battle with cancer. In 2015, Langbroek was appointed Ambassador of the Children's Cancer Foundation and shared her story at the Foundation's annual fundraiser, The Million Dollar Lunch. In January 2019, Langbroek and her family relocated to Bologna, Italy initially for the period of 1 year.

References

Further reading 
 Phillips, Mark 2006. Radio City. Melbourne: Vulgar Press (history of RRR).

External links
Kate Langbroek's Official Biography
Nova 100 – Hughesy & Kate website

1965 births
Living people
Radio personalities from Melbourne
Australian people of American descent
Australian people of Dutch descent
Australian people of Jamaican descent
Nova (radio network) announcers
Australian television talk show hosts
Australian women radio presenters